Harold Roberts may refer to:

 Harold W. Roberts (1899–1918), United States Army soldier and recipient of the Medal of Honor
 Harold Roberts (footballer) (1920–2007), English professional footballer
 Harold Roberts (politician) (1884–1950), British Conservative Member of Parliament for Birmingham Handsworth 1945–1950
 Harold C. Roberts, United States Marine Corps officer

See also
Harry Roberts (disambiguation)